The men's competition in the heavyweight (– 105 kg) division was staged on November 29, 2009.

Schedule

Medalists

Records

Results

References
Results 

- Mens 105 kg, 2009 World Weightlifting Championships